The 2018 USA Rugby League season is the 21st season overall of semi-professional rugby league competition in the United States and the 8th season under the governance of the USARL.

Results

Round 1

Round 2

Round 3

Round 4

Round 5

Round 6

Round 7

Round 8

Round 9

Semi-final

Grand final

References
 USA Rugby League Season Schedule

2018 in rugby league
USA Rugby League
Seasons in American rugby league